In Greek mythology, Thrax (by his name simply the quintessential Thracian) was regarded as one of the reputed sons of Ares. In the Alcestis, Euripides mentions that one of the names of Ares himself was Thrax since he was regarded as the patron of Thrace (his golden or gilded shield was kept in his temple at Bistonia in Thrace).

See also
 Tiras – eponymous ancestor of Thracians according to Flavius Josephus

Notes

References 
Lemprière, John and Wright, Frederick Adam. Lemprière's Classical Dictionary of Proper Names Mentioned in Ancient Authors. Routledge, 1949. 
Euripides, H. B. L., i.e. Henry Barrett Lennard, translator. The Alcestis of Euripides: Translated From The Greek Into English, Now For The First Time In Its Original Metres, With Preface, Explanatory Notes, And Stage Directions Suggesting How It Might Have Been Performed. London: R. Bentley and Sons, 1884.

Children of Ares
Greek mythology of Thrace
Epithets of Ares